Gerald Goddard (22 November 1920 – 2 April 1986) was a South African water polo player. He competed in the men's tournament at the 1952 Summer Olympics.

References

1920 births
1986 deaths
South African male water polo players
Olympic water polo players of South Africa
Water polo players at the 1952 Summer Olympics
Sportspeople from Pretoria